Irish Channel can refer to: 

 Irish Channel, New Orleans, a neighborhood of New Orleans, Louisiana, United States
 A channel north of Deer Island, New Brunswick
 A former name for the North Channel (Great Britain and Ireland), an entrance to the Irish Sea between Northern Ireland and Scotland